Whose Line Is It Anyway? (often known as simply Whose Line?) is an improvisational comedy show, which was originally hosted by Drew Carey on ABC and ABC Family and ran from August 5, 1998 to December 15, 2007. A revival of the show, hosted by Aisha Tyler, began airing on The CW on July 16, 2013. The series is a spin-off of the British show of the same name and features Ryan Stiles, Colin Mochrie, and Wayne Brady as its regular performers with the fourth seat occupied by a guest panelist. All three regulars appeared on the British series; Stiles and Mochrie were regulars there as well; Brady was a frequent guest on the final season, which moved production from London to Hollywood.

 On November 4, 2022, regular performer Mochrie announced that the show would film its final season in January 2023. On January 23, 2023, it was announced that the twentieth season will premiere on March 31, 2023.

Series overview

Episodes
"Winner(s)" of each episode as chosen by hosts Drew Carey (seasons one–eight) and Aisha Tyler (seasons nine–twenty) are highlighted in italics.  Under Drew Carey, the winner would take his seat and call a sketch for Drew to perform (often with the help of the rest).  Under Aisha Tyler, the winners perform a sketch during the credit roll, just like in the original UK series.

Season 1 (1998–99)

Season 2 (1999–2000)

Season 3 (2000–01)

Season 4 (2001–02)

Season 5 (2002–03)

Season 6 (2004)

Season 7 (2005)

Season 8 (2005–07)

Season 9 (2013)

Season 10 (2014)

Season 11 (2015)

Season 12 (2016)

Season 13 (2017)

Season 14 (2018)

Season 15 (2019)

Season 16 (2020)

Season 17 (2021)

Season 18 (2021–22)

Season 19 (2022–23)

See also
 Whose Line Is It Anyway? (British TV series)
 List of Whose Line Is It Anyway? (British TV series) episodes

References

External links
Whose Line Is It Anyway? (U.S.) (a Titles & Air Dates Guide)
Mark's guide to Whose Line is it Anyway? - Episode Guide

Whose Line Is It Anyway
Whose Line Is It Anyway?